Albert Lamorisse (13 January 1922 – 2 June 1970) was a French filmmaker, film producer, and writer of award-winning short films which he began making in the late 1940s. He also invented the strategic board game Risk in 1957.

Life
Lamorisse was born in Paris, France. He first came into prominence – just after Bim  (1950) – for directing and producing White Mane (1953), an award-winning short film that tells a fable of how a young boy befriends an untamable wild white stallion in the marshes of Camargue (the Petite Camargue).

Lamorisse's best known work is the short film The Red Balloon (1956), which earned him the Palme d'Or Grand Prize at the Cannes Film Festival, and an Oscar for writing the Best Original Screenplay in 1956.

Lamorisse also wrote, directed and produced the well-regarded films Stowaway in the Sky (1960) and Circus Angel, as well as the documentaries Versailles and Paris Jamais Vu. In addition to films, he created the popular strategy board game Risk in 1957, originally with the title La Conquête du Monde (The Conquest of the World). In the mid-sixties Lamorisse shot parts of The Prospect of Iceland, a documentary about Iceland, which was made by Henry Sandoz and commissioned by NATO.

Lamorisse died in a helicopter crash while filming the documentary Le Vent des amoureux (The Lovers' Wind), during a helicopter-tour of Iran in 1970. His son and widow completed the film, based on his production notes, and released it eight years later. It was nominated for a posthumous Oscar for best documentary. The title The Lover's Wind is translated into Bad-e Saba in Persian. A saba wind is a gentle wind that blows from the northeast, symbolizing the whispers of lovers.

Lamorisse and his wife had three children: a son named Pascal and two daughters named Sabine and Fanny. Pascal and Sabine were featured in The Red Balloon.

Filmography
Short films
 Bim (1950) ... a.k.a. Bim, le petit âne (France)
 Crin-Blanc (1953) ... a.k.a. White Mane (U.S.) and Wild Stallion
 Le Ballon rouge (1956) ... a.k.a. The Red Balloon

Feature films
 Le Voyage en ballon (1960); ... a.k.a. Stowaway in the Sky
 Fifi la plume (1965) ... a.k.a. Circus Angel (US: TV title)
 Le Vent des amoureux

Documentaries
 Djerba (1947)
 Versailles (1967)
 Paris jamais vu (1967)
 Le Vent des amoureux (1978) ... a.k.a. The Lovers' Wind

Awards
Wins
 Cannes Film Festival: Palme d'Or, White Mane, Best Short Film, Albert Lamorisse; 1953.
 Prix Jean Vigo: Prix Jean Vigo, White Mane, Short Film, Albert Lamorisse; 1953.
 Prix Louis Delluc: Prix Louis Delluc; The Red Balloon, Albert Lamorisse; 1956.
 Cannes Film Festival: Palme d'Or du court métrage/Golden Palm; The Red Balloon, Best Short Film, Albert Lamorisse; 1956.
 Academy Awards: Oscar; The Red Balloon, Best Writing, Best Original Screenplay, Albert Lamorisse; 1957.
 British Academy of Film and Television Arts: BAFTA Award; The Red Balloon, Special Award, France; 1957.
 Venice Film Festival: OCIC Award; Le Voyage en ballon; 1960.
 Cannes Film Festival: Technical Grand Prize; Fifi la plume, 1965.
 Cannes Film Festival: Technical Grand Prize – Special Mention; Versailles; 1967.
 National Board of Review: Top Foreign Films; The Red Balloon,1957.

Nominations
 British Academy of Film and Television Arts: BAFTA Film Award, White Mane, Best Documentary Film, France; 1954.
 Venice Film Festival: Golden Lion; Le Voyage en ballon; 1960.
 Cannes Film Festival: Golden Palm; Fifi la plume; 1965.
 Cannes Film Festival: Golden Palm; Best Short Film, Versailles; 1967.
 Academy Awards: Oscar; Best Documentary, Features, Le Vent des amoureux; 1979.

References

External links
 
 Albert Lamorisse at Google Books
 Albert Lamorisse at Cinema Encyclopedie 

1922 births
1970 deaths
Best Original Screenplay Academy Award winners
Board game designers
Film directors from Paris
Victims of aviation accidents or incidents in Iran
Victims of helicopter accidents or incidents
20th-century screenwriters